Utah State Route 98 may refer to:

 Utah State Route 98 (1969–2000), a former state highway in western Weber County, Utah, United States, that connected Utah State Route 27 in Hooper with Utah State Route 108 in Roy (it was added to Utah State Route 97 in 2000)
 Utah State Route 98 (1935-1969), a former state highway in western Iron County, Utah, United States, that connected Utah State Route 56 at Beryl Junction with Beryl

See also

 List of state highways in Utah
 List of highways numbered 98

External links

 State Road Resolutions: Route 98 (PDF)